Papilio toboroi is a species of butterfly in the family Papilionidae. It is found in Papua New Guinea and the Solomon Islands.

References

toboroi
Taxonomy articles created by Polbot